Olenecamptus quietus is a species of beetle in the family Cerambycidae. It was described by Pascoe in 1866. It is known from Malaysia and Indonesia.

References

Dorcaschematini
Beetles described in 1866